Barbarian Princes is 1999 live album recorded in Japan recorded by Mick Farren and friends released under the name The Deviants.

The album was recorded with long-time friend and collaborator Andy Colquhoun and featured Wayne Kramer's backing band.

Track listing 
 "Aztec Calendar" (Farren, Colquhoun)
 "Eating Jello with a Heated Fork" (Farren, Colquhoun)
 "Disgruntled Employee" (Farren, Lancaster)
 "It's Alright Ma, I'm Only Bleeding" (Bob Dylan)
 "God's Worst Nightmare" (Farren, Colquhoun)
 "Leader Hotel" (Farren, Henry Beck)
 "Lennon Song" (Colquhoun)
 "Thunder on the Mountain" (Farren, Colquhoun)
 "Lurid Night" (Farren, Colquhoun)
 "Dogpoet" (Farren, Colquhoun)

Personnel 
 Mick Farren – vocals
 Andy Colquhoun – guitar
 Doug Lunn – bass
 Ric Parnell – drums

References 

The Deviants (band) albums
1999 live albums